George Graham Stewart Grundy (24 June 1859 – 4 March 1945) was an English cricketer.  Grundy was a left-handed batsman who was a right-arm bowler, though his exact bowling style is unknown.  He was born at Cheetham Hill, Lancashire and was educated at Harrow School.

Grundy made two first-class appearances for Sussex in 1880 against Kent and Surrey.  In the match against Kent, Grundy was dismissed for 4 runs in Sussex's first-innings by Charles Cunliffe, while in their second-innings he was dismissed by the same bowler for 20 runs.  Kent won the match by 10 wickets.  Against Surrey, he was dismissed for 3 runs in Sussex's first-innings by Joseph Potter, while in their second-innings he scored 4 runs before he was caught by George Elliott off the bowling of Walter Read.  Surrey won the match by 4 wickets.

He died at Hunstanton, Norfolk on 4 March 1945.

References

External links

1859 births
1945 deaths
People from Cheetham Hill
People educated at Harrow School
English cricketers
Sussex cricketers